Zone Fantasy was a television film channel in Italy that featured diverse programming. Zone Fantasy was targeted towards a mixed 16- to 45-year-old demographic, and focused on adventure, fantasy, horror and science fiction genres.

The channel transmitted 24 hours a day, 7 days a week on SKY Italia.

The channel ceased its broadcasts on 6 September 2011 and was rebranded by Horror Channel., and the other cities are switched into VH1 Classic in 2011.

References

External links
Official site

Science fiction television channels
AMC Networks International
Italian-language television stations
Defunct television channels in Italy
Defunct television channels in Poland
Television channels and stations established in 2006
Television channels and stations disestablished in 2011
2006 establishments in Italy
2011 disestablishments in Italy